Claude-Henri de Fusée, abbé de Voisenon (8 July 1708 – 22 November 1775) was a French playwright and writer.

Life
Born at the château de Voisenon near Melun, he was only ten when he addressed an epistle in verse to Voltaire, who asked the boy to visit him. They remained friends for fifty years. Voisenon made his début as a dramatist with L'Heureuse resemblance in 1728, followed in 1739 by a three-act comedy L'École du monde at the Théâtre Français. This was preceded by a verse prologue, L'Ombre de Molière, and a month later Voisenon produced a criticism of his own piece in Le Retour de l'ombre de Molière.

A duel provoked by Voisenon inspired him with remorse, and he entered a seminary; he was soon promoted to the post of secretary to his relative, the Bishop of Boulogne. He became closely attached to Madame du Châtelet, the mistress of Voltaire, and was intimate with the comte de Caylus and Mademoiselle Jeanne Quinault. He made witty but by no means edifying contributions to the Étrennes de Saint-Jean, the Bals de Bois, etc.

In 1744 he produced the Ménages assortis and in 1746 his masterpiece, the Coquette fixée. He was a close friend of Charles Simon Favart and his wife. His pen was always at the service of any of his friends, and it was generally supposed that he had a considerable share in Favart's most successful operas. Voisenon had scruples all his life about the incongruity between his way of living and his profession, but he continued to write indecent stories for private circulation, and wrote verses in honor of Madame du Barry, as he had done for Madame de Pompadour.

He was elected to the Académie française in 1762. On the disgrace of his patron, the duc de Choiseul, he lost his pensions and honours, but soon recovered his position. He was intimate with the chancellor Maupeou, and was suspected of writing on his behalf in defence of the abolition of the parlement. This and some other incidents brought him into general disgrace. Early in 1775 he retired to the château de Voisenon, where he died.

Works 
His Œuvres complètes were published by his executrix, :fr:Constance de Lowendal, 5 vol. in-8°. in 1781.

Theatre 
1738: L'Heureuse Ressemblance, comedy in 1 act and in verse
1739: L'École du monde, comedy in 3 acts and in verse, presented at the Comédie-Française 14 October
1739: Le Retour de l'ombre de Molière, comedy in 1 act and in verse, presented at the Comédie-Française 21 November
1744: Les Mariages assortis, comedy in 3 acts and in verse, premiered by the Italian comedians ordinaires du Roi 10 February (printed in 1746, in-8)
1746: La Coquette fixée, comedy in 3 acts and in verse, with Charles-Antoine Leclerc de La Bruère and the Duke of Nivernais, premiered by the Comédiens italiens ordinaires du Roi 10 March
1749: La Fausse Prévention, comedy in 3 acts and in verse, premiered by the Comédiens italiens ordinaires du Roi 29 December
1750: Le Réveil de Thalie, comedy, premiered by the Comédiens italiens ordinaires du Roi 19 June
1753: Titon et l'Aurore, pastorale héroïque, music by Jean-Joseph Cassanéa de Mondonville, premiered at the Académie royale de musique 9 January
1756: Les Magots, parody of L'Orphelin de la Chine by Voltaire, in 1 act and in vers, premiered by the Comédiens italiens ordinaires du Roi 19 March
1757: La Petite Iphigénie, parodie de la Grande, premiered by the Comédiens italiens ordinaires du Roi July
1758: L'Amour et Psyché, ballet héroïque, premiered by the Académie Royale de musique 9 May
1759: La parodie au Parnasse, one-act opéra comique, premiered at the Théâtre de l'Opéra comique de la foire saint Germain 20 March (also attributed to Charles-Simon Favart)
1762: La Jeune Grecque, comedy in 3 acts and in free verse (printed in 1762)
1763: Hilas et Zélie, pastorale in 1 act, music by Bernard de Bury, presented at Versailles Palace 12 January
1765: La Fée Urgèle ou Ce qui plaît aux dames, four-act- comedy miongked with ariettes, given at Fontainebleau 26 October
1770: L'Amant déguisé, ou le Jardinier supposé, one-act comedy mingled with ariettes, music by François-André Danican Philidor, premiered by the Comédiens italiens ordinaires du Roi 2 September
1770:  L'Amitié à l'épreuve, comedy in 2 acts and in verse mingled with ariettes, music by André Grétry, presented at Fontainebleau 13 November
1776: Fleur d'Épine, opéra comique in 2 acts and in prose, set in music by Marie Emmanuelle Bayon Louis, mingled with ariettes, from Hamilton, premiered by the Comédiens italiens ordinaires du Roi 22 August.

Novels and tales 
1745: Zulmis et Zelmaïde, conte licencieux
1745: Turlubleu, histoire grecque tirée du manuscrit gris-de-lin, trouvé dans les cendres de Troye
1746: Le Sultan Misapouf et la princesse Grisemine, novel, London, 2 vol. in-12
1747: Les Fêtes roulantes et les Regrets des petites rues
1751: Histoire de la Félicité
1760: Tant mieux pour elle, conte plaisant
1767: Romans et Contes, 2 vol. - reed.: 1775, 1798, 1818
1885: Contes légers suivis des Anecdotes littéraires, Paris, E. Dentu, Bibliothèque choisie des chefs-d'œuvre français et étrangers, (complete text on Gallica)

Varia 
1739: Le Code des Amants, poème héroïque en trois chants
1758: Les Israélites à la montagne d'Oreb, poème biblique for the Concert Spirituel, set in music by Mondonville
1759: Les Fureurs de Saül, poème biblique for the Concert Spirituel, set in music by Mondonville

Bibliography 
 Allem, Maurice, Anthologie poétique française, XVIIIe, Paris, Garnier Frères, 1919
 Anonyme, La Vie authentique de M. l'abbé de Voisenon, mémoires inédits d'un contemporain, publiés par Ad. Van Bever et Charles Martyne, Paris, 1916
 Comoy, Jean, Un abbé de cour sous Louis XV. Monsieur de Voisenon, Préface de Wladimir d'Ormesson, Paris, la Science historique, 1959
 Grente, Georges Cardinal (dir.), Dictionnaire des lettres françaises. Le XVIIIe, nlle. édition revue et mise à jour sous la direction de :fr:François Moureau, Paris, Fayard, 1995
 Krakowski, Patrick, "Un académicien dans son temps", l'abbé de Voisenon (correspondences, chroniques, biographie) Lys Éditions Ammatéis, 2007, 
 
 Vapereau, Gustave, « Claude-Henri de Fusée de Voisenon », in Dictionnaire universel des littératures, Paris, Hachette, 1876, 2 volumes
 Viguerie, Jean de Histoire et dictionnaire du temps des Lumières. 1715-1789'', Paris, Robert Laffont, coll. Bouquins, 2003 - 

 External links 
 Fiche biographique de l'Académie française
 Ses pièces et leurs représentations sur le site CÉSAR

ReferencesAttribution:'''

1708 births
1775 deaths
Fusee de Voisenon, Claude-Henri de
Counts of Voisenon
18th-century French writers
18th-century French male writers
French erotica writers
French ballet librettists
Voisenon, Claude-Henri de Fusee de
French abbots